Vicarious trauma (VT) was a term invented by McCann and Pearlman that is used to describe how working with traumatized clients affects trauma therapists. Previously, the phenomenon was referred to as secondary traumatic stress coined by Dr. Charles Figley. The theory behind vicarious trauma is that the therapist has a profound world change and is permanently altered by the interaction of empathetic bonding with a client. This change is thought to have three conditional requirements: empathic engagement and exposure to graphic and traumatizing material, the therapist being exposed to human cruelty, and reenactment of trauma within the therapy process. This change can produce changes in a therapist’s sense of spirituality, worldview, and self-identity.

Vicarious trauma is still a subject of debate by theorists, with some saying it is based on the concept of countertransference, burnout, and compassion fatigue. McCann and Pearlman argue, however, that there is probably a relationship between these constructs, but vicarious trauma is unique and distinct.

As time has progressed, the term vicarious trauma has expanded to more than just indirect trauma experienced by trauma therapists and has come to include many more populations, although the phenomenon is still evolving.

Signs and symptoms
The symptoms of vicarious trauma align with the symptoms of primary, actual trauma. When helping professionals attempt to connect with their clients/victims emotionally, the symptoms of vicarious trauma can create emotional disturbance such as feelings of sadness, grief, irritability and mood swings. The signs and symptoms of vicarious trauma parallel those of direct trauma, although they tend to be less intense. Workers who have personal trauma histories may be more vulnerable to VT, although the research findings on this point are mixed. Common signs and symptoms include, but are not limited to, social withdrawal; mood swings; aggression; greater sensitivity to violence; somatic symptoms; sleep difficulties; intrusive imagery; cynicism; sexual difficulties; difficulty managing boundaries with clients; and core beliefs and resulting difficulty in relationships reflecting problems with security, trust, esteem, intimacy, and control.

Contributing factors
Vicarious trauma, conceptually based in constructivist self-development theory, arises from an interaction between individuals and their situations. This means that the individual helper's personal history (including prior traumatic experiences), coping strategies, and support network, among other things, all interact with his or her situation (including work setting, the nature of the work s/he does, the specific clientele served, etc.), to give rise to individual expressions of vicarious trauma. This in turn implies the individual nature of responses or adaptations to VT as well as individual ways of coping with and transforming it. Some have postulated that this traumatization occurs when one's view of the world or a feeling of safety is shattered by hearing about the experiences of their clients. This exposure to trauma, however indirectly, can cause an interruption to the daily functioning of the clinician reducing their effectiveness.

Anything that interferes with the helper's ability to fulfill his/her responsibility to assist traumatized clients can contribute to vicarious trauma. Many human service workers report that administrative and bureaucratic factors that impediment to their effectiveness influence work satisfaction. Negative aspects of the organization as a whole, such as reorganization, downsizing in the name of change management and a lack of resources in the name of lean management, contribute to burned-out workers.

Vicarious trauma has also been attributed to the stigmatization of mental health care among service providers. Stigma leads to an inability to engage in self care and eventually the service provider may reach burnout, and become more likely to experience VT. The research has also begun to show that vicarious trauma is more prominent in those with a prior history of trauma and adversity. Research indicates that a mental health provider's defense style might pose as a risk factor for vicarious traumatization. Mental health providers with self-sacrificing defense styles have been found to experience increased vicarious traumatization.

Research has demonstrated that females are more likely to develop secondary traumatic stress than males and counselors not in private practice are more likely to develop secondary traumatic stress. Those with stronger counselor professional identity (CPI) experience less secondary traumatic stress as well.

Specifically, in EMS personnel, previous veteran status increased likelihood of experiencing vicarious trauma.

Related concepts
While the term "vicarious trauma" has been used interchangeably with "compassion fatigue", "secondary traumatic stress disorder," "burnout," "countertransference," and "work-related stress," there are important differences. These include the following:

 Unlike compassion fatigue, VT is a theory-based construct. This means that observable symptoms can serve as the starting for a process of discovering contributing factors and related signs, symptoms, and adaptations. VT also specifies psychological domains that can be affected, rather than specific symptoms that may arise. This specificity may more accurately guide preventive measures and interventions, and allow for the accurate development of interventions for multiple domains (such as changes in the balance between psychotherapy and other work-related tasks and changes in self-care practices).
 Countertransference is the psychotherapist's response to a particular client. VT refers to responses across clients, across time.
 Unlike burnout, countertransference, and work-related stress, VT is specific to trauma workers. This means that the helper will experience trauma-specific difficulties, such as intrusive imagery, that are not part of burnout or countertransference. The burnout and vicarious traumatization constructs overlap, specifically regarding emotional exhaustion. A worker may experience both VT and burnout, and each has its own remedies. VT and countertransference may also co-occur, intensifying each other.
 Unlike vicarious trauma, countertransference can be a very useful tool for psychotherapists, providing them with important information about their clients.
 Work-related stress is a generic term without a theoretical basis, specific signs and symptoms or contributing factors, or remedies. Burnout and vicarious trauma can co-exist. Countertransference responses may potentiate vicarious trauma.
 Vicarious post-traumatic growth, unlike VTF, is not a theory-based construct but rather is based on self-reported signs.
 Body-centred countertransference

Mechanism
The posited mechanism for vicarious traumatization is empathy. Different forms of empathy may result in different effects on helpers. Batson and colleagues have conducted research that might inform trauma helpers about ways to manage empathic connection constructively. If helpers identify with their trauma survivor clients and immerse themselves in thinking about what it would be like if these events happened to them, they are likely to experience personal distress, feeling upset, worried, distressed. On the other hand, if helpers instead imagine what the client experienced, they may be more likely to feel compassion and moved to help.

Measurement
Over the years, people have measured VT in a wide variety of ways. Vicarious trauma is a multifaceted construct requiring a multifaceted assessment. More specifically, the aspects of VT that would need to be measured for a complete assessment include self capacities, ego resources, frame of reference (identity, world view, and spirituality), psychological needs, and trauma symptoms. Measuring of some of these elements of VT exist, including the following:

 Psychological needs, using the Trauma and Attachment Belief Scale
 Self capacities, using the Inner Experience Questionnaire and/or the Inventory of Altered Self-Capacities
 Trauma symptoms, using the PTSD Checklist, Impact of Events Scale, Impact of Events Scale-Revised, children's revised Impact of Events Scale (Arabic Version), Trauma Symptom Inventory, Detailed Assessment of Posttraumatic Stress, and/or the World Assumptions Scale
Secondary Traumatic Stress Scale is a 17 item, 5-point Likert scale that distinguishes between PTSD measures by framing the questions as stressors from exposure to clients.
The Professional Quality of Life (ProQol) version 5. This assessment has 30 questions on a 5-point Likert scale and measures compassion fatigue and secondary trauma.

Addressing
Vicarious traumatization is not the responsibility of clients or systems, although institutions that provide trauma-related services bear a responsibility to create policies and work settings that facilitate staff (and therefore client) well-being. Each trauma worker is responsible for self-care, working reflectively, and engaging in regular, frequent, trauma-informed professional confidential consultation.

There are many ways of addressing vicarious traumatization. All involve awareness, balance, and connection. One set of approaches can be grouped together as coping strategies. These include, for example, self-care, rest, escape, and play. A second set of approaches can be grouped as transforming strategies. Transforming strategies aim to help workers create community and find meaning through the work. Within each category, strategies may be applied in one's personal life and professional life. Organizations that provide trauma services can also play a role in mitigating vicarious trauma. 

Research shows that many simple things increase happiness and this aids to lessen the impact of vicarious traumatization. People who are more socially connected tend to be happier. People who consciously practice gratitude are also shown happier. Creative endeavors that are completely detached with work also increase happiness. Self-care practices like yoga, qigong, and sitting meditation are found to be helpful for those who practice. HBR in a case study regarding to traumatization stated that it is essential to create an organizational culture in which it is cool to be a social worker or a counselor, where these professionals are empowered to influence the workplace issues, the strategy of human services in both corporate and care services. Additionally, research indicates clinicians who are exposed to vicarious trauma are in need of targeted interventions that will boost their resilience. Findings have show interventions such as respite, increasing self efficacy, and having appropriate professional support buffer against the effects of vicarious trauma.

Individuals Found to Experience Vicarious Trauma

Children 
Children have been found to experience vicarious trauma from the traumas experienced by their caregivers and peers. In children the following factors have been found to predict vicarious trauma symptoms:

 Socioeconomic status

 Gender (girls more than boys)
 Race
 Witnessing the trauma directly
 Caregiver warmth and hostility

Foster Parents 
Foster parents have been found to experience vicarious trauma related to the trauma of those they care for. Several studies have found that foster parents experience vicarious trauma, burnout, and compassion fatigue and report that emotional disengagement (a common symptom of VT) is a coping strategy.

Counselors and Other Mental Health Providers 
Counselors and other mental health professional have been found to experience vicarious trauma when working with veterans and others that have experienced trauma. Some of the factors that predict vicarious trauma severity include:

 Professional trauma
 Level of peer supervision
 Social support availability
 Emotional coping strategies 
Long hours and high caseloads 
Population served by the clinician 
Defense mechanisms of the therapist

American Muslims 
After the terrorist attack on the World Trade Center in the United States, many Muslims were relegated with terrorists and attacks of violence were perpetrated against them. This caused many individuals in this community to experience vicarious trauma and added to a feeling of worry and being unsafe. Those feeling a stronger sense of religious identity were more likely to experience vicarious trauma.

See also
 Allostatic load
 Emotional labor
 Historical trauma
 Secondary traumatic stress
 W. H. R. Rivers

References

Further reading

External links
 University of Pennsylvania Positive Psychology Center
 Vicarious Trauma Among Therapists, University of Alberta

Counseling
Types of mental disorders